The canton of Le Diois is an administrative division of the Drôme department, southeastern France. It was created at the French canton reorganisation which came into effect in March 2015. Its seat is in Die.

It consists of the following communes:
 
Arnayon
Aubenasson
Aucelon
Aurel
Barnave
Barsac
La Bâtie-des-Fonds
Beaumont-en-Diois
Beaurières
Bellegarde-en-Diois
Boulc
Brette
Chalancon
Chamaloc
Charens
Chastel-Arnaud
Châtillon-en-Diois
La Chaudière
Die
Espenel
Establet
Eygluy-Escoulin
Glandage
Gumiane
Jonchères
Laval-d'Aix
Lesches-en-Diois
Luc-en-Diois
Lus-la-Croix-Haute
Marignac-en-Diois
Menglon
Miscon
Montlaur-en-Diois
Montmaur-en-Diois
La Motte-Chalancon
Pennes-le-Sec
Ponet-et-Saint-Auban
Pontaix
Poyols
Pradelle
Les Prés
Recoubeau-Jansac
Rimon-et-Savel
Rochefourchat
Romeyer
Rottier
Saillans
Saint-Andéol
Saint-Benoit-en-Diois
Saint-Dizier-en-Diois
Sainte-Croix
Saint-Julien-en-Quint
Saint-Nazaire-le-Désert
Saint-Roman
Saint-Sauveur-en-Diois
Solaure-en-Diois
Vachères-en-Quint
Val-Maravel
Valdrôme
Vercheny
Véronne
Volvent

References

Cantons of Drôme